Matthias Chika Mordi (born in 1967)  is from Delta State, in Nigeria and was a refugee during Nigeria’s civil war. He is an economist by training and a banker. He is the Chief Executive Officer of National Competitiveness Council of Nigeria and is the current Chairman of United Capital PLC. He is an Honourable Senior member of the Chartered Institute of Bankers of Nigeria and alternate president of the West African Institute of Bankers (2005-2008).

Education
Mordi has an MBA and four Master's degrees in Public Sector Leadership and Policy, IESE Business School, Harvard Business School, Harvard Kennedy School of Gov't, Johns Hopkins University - Paul H. Nitze School of Advanced International Studies, and American Univ.BSc in Economics, University of Ilorin.

Career
Chika is a professional banker and he had spent over two decades in various roles in the banking industry, including retail and investment banking corporate banking and venture capital. Chika was the Executive Director of Corporate and Investment Banking of Standard Trust Bank (1999-2003). On 2003, he acted as MD/CEO of Continental Trust Bank until 2005. On 2005 he moved to BA Capital until 2008. In 2010, he acted as Chief Executive Officer of Accender Africa in Washington D.C until 2013.

Mordi is famous for co-leading the team that turned around Standard Trust (now UBA) and built it into the largest sub-Saharan African banking group (outside South Africa) in a space of seven years. The bank moved from 12 branches, 10,000 account holders, negative equity and less than three hundred employees to a $3.2 billion dollar (Dec 31, 2007), 700 branch footprint, 12,000 employees and a presence across the continent.

Chika is an active participant in capital markets and he is registered with the Securities and Exchange Commission (Nigeria) in 1991, registered with the United Kingdom’s Financial Services Authority and has since managed and executed several landmark transactions in sub-Saharan Africa. He has served as a board director of over twenty financial institutions in Africa and the United Kingdom and several non-financial institutions.

In 2016, Mordi was appointed to the advisory board of Harvard University’s Shorenstein Center. Chika served on the World Economic Forum’s Global Agenda Board, several government committees and was a member of The Crans Montana Forum. Mordi incubated businesses in aviation, energy and communications in Sub Saharan Africa.

Philosophy
Matthias Chika Mordi is a fiscal conservative and radical proponent of free markets, liberal democracy and is committed to reducing extreme poverty and transformative development in Africa. He believes that a country can be moved out of poverty through created prosperity and not inherited prosperity physically endowed wealth like oil, ores and mineral resources- because created prosperity sustains job rich economic growth and sustained growth leads to socio-economic outcomes over time.

References

Harvard Kennedy School alumni
Harvard Business School alumni
1967 births
Living people
Paul H. Nitze School of Advanced International Studies alumni